Mehnga Singh (born 15 August 1922) is an Indian athlete. He competed in the men's high jump at the 1952 Summer Olympics.

References

External links
 

1922 births
Possibly living people
Athletes (track and field) at the 1952 Summer Olympics
Indian male high jumpers
Olympic athletes of India
Place of birth missing